The Cost of Living Like This is a novel by Scottish writer James Kennaway. It was the first of Kennaway's novels to be published following his death in a car accident in 1968.

The novel tells the story of Julian, a 38-year-old British government economist who has learned he has terminal lung cancer. As his marriage comes under increasing strain, he begins an extra-marital relationship with his office junior, seventeen-year-old Sally Cohen.

The theme of a love triangle also features in Kennaway's previous novel, Some Gorgeous Accident (1967), which had been inspired by Kennaway's wife's affair with John Le Carré.

Scottish novels
1969 British novels
Novels by James Kennaway
Novels published posthumously
Atheneum Books books